Carex dallii is an uncommon species of sedge native to the South Island (North West Nelson, Westland and Otago) of New Zealand. Its culms are approximately 500×0.5 mm when mature, and rhizomes are about 1 mm diameter.

References
 Encyclopedia of Life entry
 New Zealand Plant Conservation Network entry

External links

dallii
Flora of the South Island
Plants described in 1894